The desert plain slider (Lerista aericeps)  is a species of skink found in Northern Territory, Queensland, and New South Wales in Australia.

References

Lerista
Reptiles described in 1986
Taxa named by Glen Milton Storr